James Pratt Andrews (June 5, 1865 – December 27, 1907) was an American professional baseball right fielder. He played in Major League Baseball (MLB) in 1890 for the Chicago Colts of the National League.  He was a native of Shelburne Falls, Massachusetts.

In , his only Major League season, Andrews was in the starting lineup for the first 2½ months (April 19 – July 4) of the 5½ month season.  In 53 games he was just 38-for-202, a batting average of .188.  He had 3 home runs, 17 RBI, and scored 32 runs.  An average fielder for the era, he handled 90 out of 100 chances successfully for a fielding percentage of .900.

To give some perspective to his value to the team, the Colts were 29-28 during his time with them, and 54-25 after he was gone.

Andrews died at the age of 42 in Chicago of pulmonary tuberculosis, and was laid to rest at Mount Olivet Cemetery.

External links

Baseball Almanac
Retrosheet
Dead Ball Era

1865 births
1907 deaths
Baseball players from Massachusetts
Major League Baseball right fielders
Chicago Colts players
19th-century baseball players
People from Shelburne Falls, Massachusetts
20th-century deaths from tuberculosis
Tuberculosis deaths in Illinois
Chicago Whitings players